In late March 2004, at the Australian Championships in Sydney, Ian Thorpe lined up in the heats of the 400 m freestyle, but overbalanced whilst on the blocks and fell into the water, resulting in his disqualification.

Events
An attempted appeal, asserting that a noise had caused him to make the mistake, was dismissed, ending his chance to defend the 400 m Olympic title. This prompted widespread debate, with former swimmer Shane Gould asserting that the selection policy should be relaxed to maximise Australia's chances by selecting Thorpe, while Talbot, head coach Leigh Nugent and Kieren Perkins defended the selection policy. Public debate was also widespread, with Prime Minister of Australia John Howard describing the situation as a "tragedy".

Despite the intense media spotlight, Thorpe won the 100 m and 200 m freestyle events in times of 48.83s and 1 min 45.07s respectively to ensure his selection for Athens. Craig Stevens, who had claimed the second qualifying position in the 400 m event, subsequently faced immense public pressure to relinquish his position to Thorpe, with The Australians front-page headline reading "Only one man can come to the rescue". Although Thorpe said that Stevens should not be pressured into stepping aside, he was also criticised by columnists who felt that he was implicitly pressuring Stevens, for not unequivocally ruling himself out. Stevens later relinquished the position, in an interview with the Seven Network, who paid him A$130,000 for the rights to broadcast his announcement. This generated ethical debate as to whether Stevens had made a decision in the national interest or sold Thorpe a gold medal, with The Sydney Morning Heralds headline reading "It's your race, Ian, at $325 a metre".

Thorpe accepted the position and was further attacked by Perkins, who described the affair as "grubby" and "a very, very sad tale for Australian sport", saying the pressure put upon Stevens was "disgusting".

References

Ian Thorpe
2004 controversies
2004 in Australian sport
2004 in swimming
Controversies in Australia
Swimming in Australia
Swimming controversies
Sports scandals in Australia